Summerjam is a European reggae festival. It takes places annually in July at the Fühlinger See, which is a lake located in Cologne, Germany. The event usually attracts an audience of between 25,000 and 30,000 people. Two stages and two tents are located on an island, with the camping area surrounding the lake.

From 1985 to 1993 the Summerjam took place at the Loreley, in 1994 and 1995 at the airport Wildenrath and since 1996 at its present location in Cologne. Throughout the festival's history, many major reggae acts have performed there including (among many others):

Black Uhuru, Dennis Brown, Jimmy Cliff, Fantan Mojah, Third World, Steel Pulse, Aswad, Freddie McGregor, Sly and Robbie, Burning Spear, Linton Kwei Johnson, The Abyssinians, Culture, Misty In Roots, Israel Vibration, Lee Scratch Perry, Radical Dance Faction, Lucky Dube, Tony Rebel, Maxi Priest, Bunny Wailer, Shaggy, Beenie Man, Sizzla, Sean Paul, Groundation, Alpha Blondy, Chronixx

Gallery

See also

List of reggae festivals
Reggae

External links

 Official website
 Photos from Summerjam at Flickr
 Summerjam 2009 Photos from Rastafari.be

Reggae festivals
Music festivals in Germany
Summer festivals
Culture of North Rhine-Westphalia
Festivals in Cologne
1985 establishments in Germany
Recurring events established in 1985
Annual events in Germany